.kiwi is an Internet generic top-level domain with emphasis on New Zealand. It employs the colloquial term kiwi, used to refer to New Zealanders. It is the first, and presently only, New Zealand-specific top level domain name approved by ICANN.

History 
Dot Kiwi Limited reportedly spent a "seven-figure" sum securing the new top level domain from the Internet Corporation for Assigned Names and Numbers (ICANN).

The domain launched with a 'landrush' period in March 2014 after two years of planning. 

In May 2014, shortly after launch, 4,600 .kiwi domains had been activated. As at the first anniversary on 1 May 2015, 12,000 .kiwi domains had been registered. Dot Kiwi Limited claimed that this meant .kiwi was in the top 25 per cent of new domains released by ICANN. 

The .kiwi top level domain is not to be confused with .kiwi.nz, which launched as a new option under the .nz top level domain in August 2012.

The technical backend is provided by the Canadian Internet Registration Authority's Fury product.

Accredited registrars
As of 6 December 2016.

 101 Domain
 123.reg
 CoreHub
 Crazydomains.com
 CSC
 Dynadot
 Gandi.net
 GoDaddy
 IP Mirror
 Marcaria
 Network Solutions
 STrato
 Regtons
 Amazon Route 53

See also
 .nz

References

Further reading

External links
 IANA .kiwi whois information
 Dot-Kiwi official website

Internet in New Zealand
Mass media in New Zealand